Barbadian Brazilians or Bajans, refers to Brazilian people of full, partial or predominantly Barbadian ancestry, or Barbadian-born people residing in Brazil. 

At the beginning of the 20th century, many Barbadians worked in the Amazonas region, Pará and Rondônia. There had been a mass exodus from the Caribbean in order to take part in the rubber boom, and the poor socio-economic conditions in Barbados at the time made Brazil an enticing place to search for a better life. In 1911 Roger Casement who was a British consular official at the time undertook a special investigation of the condition of Barbadian workers in the Putomayo Valley then part of Peru traveling to that region by going up the Amazon.  The Barbadian presence is still evidenced in the existence of surnames such as Alleyne, Mottley, Maloney, Depeiza, Blackman and Layne.

See also
Caribbean Brazilian
Barbados–Brazil relations

References

Caribbean Brazilian
 
Barbados–Brazil relations
Caribbean diaspora by country